Grevillea trachytheca, commonly known as vanilla grevillea or the rough-fruit grevillea is a shrub of the genus Grevillea native to an area in the Mid West and Gascoyne regions of Western Australia.

Description
It blooms between May and October and produces a terminal raceme irregular inflorescence with white or cream strongly-scented flowers and white or cream styles. It regenerates from seed only and is very closely related to Grevillea crithmifolia, which has a shorter conflorescence and divided leaves.

Taxonomy
Grevillea trachytheca was first described the botanist Ferdinand von Mueller in Fragmenta phytographiae Australiae in 1888.

Distribution
It is commonly found amongst medium to low trees in shrubland it is restricted to areas near Kalbarri and the lower part of the Murchison River. It grows in calcareous sandy soils.

Cultivation
Grevillea trachytheca is used in gardens with dry soils that is suitable in a Mediterranean climate and in coastal areas, it can be used as an informal hedge, border planting or as a windbreak. It prefers full sun and can tolerate wind and salt.

See also
 List of Grevillea species

References

trachytheca
Endemic flora of Western Australia
Eudicots of Western Australia
Proteales of Australia
Taxa named by Ferdinand von Mueller
Plants described in 1888